The Black Ships (in , Edo period term) was the name given to Western vessels arriving in Japan in the 16th and 19th centuries.

In 1543 Portuguese initiated the first contacts, establishing a trade route linking Goa to Nagasaki. The large carracks engaged in this trade had the hull painted black with pitch, and the term came to represent all Western vessels. In 1639, after suppressing a rebellion blamed on the influence of Christian thought, the ruling Tokugawa shogunate retreated into an isolationist policy, the Sakoku. During this "locked state", contact with Japan by Westerners was restricted to Dejima island at Nagasaki.

In 1844, William II of the Netherlands urged Japan to open, but was rejected.  On July 8, 1853, the U.S. Navy sent four warships into the bay at Edo and threatened to attack if Japan did not begin trade with the West. Their arrival marked the reopening of the country to political dialogue after more than two hundred years of self-imposed isolation. Trade with Western nations would not come until the Treaty of Amity and Commerce more than five years later.

In particular, kurofune refers to Mississippi, Plymouth, Saratoga, and Susquehanna of the Perry Expedition for the opening of Japan, 1852–1854, that arrived on July 14, 1853, at Uraga Harbor (part of present-day Yokosuka) in Kanagawa Prefecture, Japan under the command of United States Commodore Matthew Perry.  Black refers to the black color of the older sailing vessels, and the black smoke from the coal-fired steam engines of the American ships. In this sense, the kurofune became a symbol of the ending of isolation.

First kurofune ships: nau do trato

In 1543 Portuguese traders arrived in Japan initiating the first contacts with the West. Soon they established a trade route linking their headquarters in Goa, via Malacca to Nagasaki.  Large carracks engaged in the flourishing "Nanban trade", introducing modern inventions from the European traders, such as refined sugar, optics, and firearms; it was the firearms, arquebuses, which became a major innovation of the Sengoku period—a time of intense internal warfare—when the matchlocks were replicated.  Later, they engaged in triangular trade, exchanging silver from Japan with silk from China via Macau.

Carracks of 1200 to 1600 tons, named nau do trato ("treaty ship") or nau da China by the Portuguese, engaged in this trade had the hull painted black with pitch, and the term came to apply for all western vessels. The name was inscribed in the Nippo Jisho, the first western Japanese dictionary compiled in 1603.

In 1549 Spanish missionary Francis Xavier started a Jesuit mission in Japan. Christianity spread, mingled with the new trade, making 300,000 converts among peasants and some daimyō (warlords). In 1637 the Shimabara Rebellion blamed on the Christian influence was suppressed. Portuguese traders and Jesuit missionaries faced progressively tighter restrictions, and were confined to the island of Dejima before being expelled in 1639.

Only a limited-scale trade and diplomatic relations with China, Korea, the Ryukyu Islands, and the Dutch was maintained. The Sakoku policy remained in effect until 1853 with the arrival of Commodore Perry and the "opening" of Japan.

Gunboat diplomacy
Commodore Perry's superior military force was the principal factor in negotiating a treaty allowing American trade with Japan, thus effectively ending the Sakoku period of more than 200 years in which trading with Japan had been permitted to the Dutch, Koreans, Chinese, and Ainu exclusively.

The sight of the four ships entering Edo Bay, roaring black smoke into the air and capable of moving under their own power, deeply frightened the Japanese. Perry ignored the requests arriving from the shore that he should move to Nagasaki—the official port for trade with the outside—and threatened in turn to take his ships directly to Edo, and burn the city to the ground if he was not allowed to land. It was eventually agreed upon that he should land nearby at Kurihama, whereupon he delivered his letter and left.

The following year, at the Convention of Kanagawa, Perry returned with a fleet of eight of the fearsome Black Ships, to demonstrate the power of the United States navy, and to lend weight to his announcement that he would not leave again, until he had a treaty. In the interim, after a debate by officials the Japanese government had decided to avoid war and agree to a treaty with the United States.  

After roughly a month of negotiations, the shōguns officials presented Perry with the Treaty of Peace and Amity. Perry refused certain conditions of the treaty but agreed to defer their resolution to a later time, and finally establishing formal diplomatic relations between Japan and the United States. The fleet departed, leaving behind a consul, Townsend Harris, at Shimoda to negotiate a more permanent agreement. The Harris Treaty was signed with the United States on July 29, 1858, and within five years of the signing of the Treaty of Peace and Amity, Japan had moved to sign treaties with other Western countries.

The surprise and fear inspired by the first visit of the Black Ships are described in this famous kyōka (a humorous poem in 31-syllable waka form):

This poem is a complex set of puns (in Japanese, kakekotoba or "pivot words"). Taihei (泰平) means "tranquil"; Jōkisen (上喜撰) is the name of a costly brand of green tea containing large amounts of caffeine; and shihai (四杯) means "four cups", so a literal translation of the poem is:

There is an alternative translation, based on the pivot words. Taihei can refer to the "Pacific Ocean" (太平); jōkisen also means "steam-powered ships" (蒸気船); and shihai also means "four vessels". The poem, therefore, has a hidden meaning:

Kurofune ("The Black Ships") is also the title of the first Japanese opera, composed by Kosaku Yamada, "based on the story of Tojin Okichi, a geisha caught up in the turmoil that swept Japan in the waning years of the Tokugawa shogunate", which premiered in 1940.

See also
 Treaty of Shimoda
 Russian frigate Pallada
 French Military Mission to Japan (1867-1868)
 Gunboat diplomacy
 Dutch missions to Edo
 Sakoku
 United States expedition to Korea
 Pacific Overtures, a musical about Japan's westernization in the 19th century by Stephen Sondheim
 Madama Butterfly, an opera about a US Navy officer and his Japanese wife by Giacomo Puccini

Notes

References
 
  [digitized by University of Hong Kong Libraries, Digital Initiatives, "China Through Western Eyes." ]
  [digitized by University of Hong Kong Libraries, Digital Initiatives, "China Through Western Eyes." ]

External links
Black Ship Festival celebrating the arrival of the Blackships and the opening of Japan to the world.
New National Theatre Tokyo
Opera Japonica

Articles containing Japanese poems
History of United States expansionism
Japan–United States relations
History of the foreign relations of Japan
Edo period
1853 in the United States
Meiji Restoration
Maritime history of Portugal